Lessons From the Edge: A Memoir is a memoir by Marie Yovanovitch a former United States ambassador to Ukraine and a witness in the first Trump impeachment trial. It was published by Mariner Books in March 2022. This book was first listed as number two on the New York Times Hardcover Nonfiction Bestseller List. It later moved to number three and eight.

References

External links

Yovanovitch interview with David Remnick. The New Yorker. March 1, 2022.

2022 non-fiction books
Books about Ukraine
American memoirs
American non-fiction books
Books about the Trump administration
Mariner Books books